Year of the Gun may refer to:
Year of the Gun (film), 1991 film 
a term coined by Toronto media; see Crime in Toronto